Stelvio Massi (26 March 1929 – 26 March 2004), sometimes credited "Max Steel", was an Italian director known for his "poliziotteschi" films.

Career
Massi entered the cinema industry in 1952 as assistant camera operator, and in 1954 he became a cameraman.  Ten years later he began to work as cinematographer, and in 1973 he debuted as film director with Macrò. He obtained a great commercial success with the Mark il poliziotto film series, then with a series of poliziotteschi starred by Maurizio Merli.

Massi also worked on television, directing the 1987 TV series Due assi per un turbo. His son Danilo is also a film director.

Filmography
Note: The films listed as N/A are not necessarily chronological.
{| class="wikitable sortable plainrowheaders"
! width="15%" rowspan="2" scope="col" | Title !! width="4%" rowspan="2" scope="col" | Year!! colspan="4" scope="col" | Credited as !! width="10%" rowspan="2" scope="col" class="unsortable"| Notes !! width="1%" rowspan="2" scope="col" class="unsortable" |
|-
! width=6% |Director!! width=6% | Screenwriter!! width=6% |Cinematographer!! width=6% | Other
|-

!scope="row"|
|1957
| 
| 
| 
| 
| Camera operator
|style="text-align:center;"|
|-
!scope="row"|Duel of the Titans
|1961
| 
| 
| 
| 
| Camera operator
|style="text-align:center;"|
|-

!scope="row"|
|rowspan="2"|1964
| 
| 
| 
| 
| Camera operator
|style="text-align:center;"|
|-
!scope="row"|Genoveffa di Brabante
| 
| 
| 
| 
|
|style="text-align:center;"|
|-
!scope="row"|Per il gusto di uccidere
|1966
| 
| 
| 
| 
|
|style="text-align:center;"|
|-
!scope="row"|
|1968
| 
| 
| 
| 
|
|style="text-align:center;"|
|-
!scope="row"|
|1969
| 
| 
| 
| 
|
|style="text-align:center;"|
|-
!scope="row"|
|rowspan="3"|1970
| 
| 
| 
| 
|
|style="text-align:center;"|
|-
!scope="row"|Sartana's Here… Trade Your Pistol for a Coffin
| 
| 
| 
| 
|
|style="text-align:center;"|
|-
!scope="row"|Have a Good Funeral, My Friend... Sartana Will Pay
| 
| 
| 
| 
|
|style="text-align:center;"|
|-
!scope="row"|Emergency Squad
|1974
| 
| 
| 
| 
|
|style="text-align:center;"|
|-
!scope="row"|Mark of the Cop
|rowspan="2"|1975
| 
| 
| 
| 
|
|style="text-align:center;"|
|-
!scope="row"|Mark Shoots First
| 
| 
| 
| 
|
|style="text-align:center;"|
|-
!scope="row"|Cross Shot
|rowspan="3"|1976
| 
| 
| 
| 
|
|style="text-align:center;"|
|-
!scope="row"|Mark Strikes Again
| 
| 
| 
| 
|
|style="text-align:center;"|
|-
!scope="row"|
| 
| 
| 
| 
|
|style="text-align:center;"|
|-
!scope="row"|Destruction Force
|rowspan="2"|1977
| 
| 
| 
| 
|
|style="text-align:center;"|
|-
!scope="row"|Highway Racer
| 
| 
| 
| 
|
|style="text-align:center;"|
|-
!scope="row"|Fearless
|rowspan="3"|1978
| 
| 
| 
| 
|
|style="text-align:center;"|
|-
!scope="row"|
| 
| 
| 
| 
|
|style="text-align:center;"|
|-
!scope="row"|Convoy Busters
| 
| 
| 
| 
|
|style="text-align:center;"|
|-
!scope="row"|Hunted City
|1979
| 
| 
| 
| 
|
|style="text-align:center;"|
|-
!scope="row"|
|1980
| 
| 
| 
| 
|
|style="text-align:center;"|
|-
!scope="row"|In ginocchio da te
|
| 
| 
| 
| 
|
|style="text-align:center;"|
|-
!scope="row"|Tears on Your Face
|
| 
| 
| 
| 
|
|style="text-align:center;"|
|-
!scope="row"|Non son degno di te
|
| 
| 
| 
| 
|
|style="text-align:center;"|
|-
!scope="row"|'Se non avessi più te|
| 
| 
| 
| 
|
|style="text-align:center;"|
|-
!scope="row"|Doc, Hands of Steel|
| 
| 
| 
| 
|
|style="text-align:center;"|
|-
!scope="row"|Due oriundi per Cesare|
| 
| 
| 
| 
|
|style="text-align:center;"|
|-
!scope="row"|Mi vedrai tornare|
| 
| 
| 
| 
|
|style="text-align:center;"|
|-
!scope="row"|Nessuno mi può giudicare|
| 
| 
| 
| 
|
|style="text-align:center;"|
|-
!scope="row"|
|
| 
| 
| 
| 
|
|style="text-align:center;"|
|-
!scope="row"|15 forche per un assassino|
| 
| 
| 
| 
|
|style="text-align:center;"|
|-
!scope="row"|I ragazzi di Bandiera Gialla|
| 
| 
| 
| 
|
|style="text-align:center;"|
|-
!scope="row"|Tiffany Memorandum|
| 
| 
| 
| 
|
|style="text-align:center;"|
|-
!scope="row"|Your Turn to Die|
| 
| 
| 
| 
|
|style="text-align:center;"|
|-
!scope="row"|Brutti di notte|
| 
| 
| 
| 
|
|style="text-align:center;"|
|-
!scope="row"|
|
| 
| 
| 
| 
|
|style="text-align:center;"|
|-
!scope="row"|I'll Sell My Skin Dearly|
| 
| 
| 
| 
|
|style="text-align:center;"|
|-
!scope="row"|Alibi|
| 
| 
| 
| 
|
|style="text-align:center;"|
|-
!scope="row"|
|
| 
| 
| 
| 
|
|style="text-align:center;"|
|-
!scope="row"|Dio perdoni la mia pistola|
| 
| 
| 
| 
|
|style="text-align:center;"|
|-
!scope="row"|Un posto all'inferno|
| 
| 
| 
| 
|
|style="text-align:center;"|
|-
!scope="row"|They Call Him Cemetery|
| 
| 
| 
| 
|
|style="text-align:center;"|
|-
!scope="row"|Il sergente Klems|
| 
| 
| 
| 
|
|style="text-align:center;"|
|-
!scope="row"|They Call Me Hallelujah|
| 
| 
| 
| 
|
|style="text-align:center;"|
|-
!scope="row"|Winged Devils|
| 
| 
| 
| 
|
|style="text-align:center;"|
|-
!scope="row"|
|
| 
| 
| 
| 
|
|style="text-align:center;"|
|-
!scope="row"|Return of Halleluja|
| 
| 
| 
| 
|
|style="text-align:center;"|
|-
!scope="row"|Il brigadiere Pasquale Zagaria ama la mamma e la polizia|
| 
| 
| 
| 
|
|style="text-align:center;"|
|-
!scope="row"|Giovannona Long-Thigh|
| 
| 
| 
| 
|
|style="text-align:center;"|
|-
!scope="row"|Ingrid sulla strada|
| 
| 
| 
| 
|
|style="text-align:center;"|
|-
!scope="row"|Man Called Invincible|
| 
| 
| 
| 
|
|style="text-align:center;"|
|-
!scope="row"|Partirono preti, tornarono... curati|
| 
| 
| 
| 
|
|style="text-align:center;"|
|-
!scope="row"|Giuda uccide il venerdì|
| 
| 
| 
| 
|
|style="text-align:center;"|
|-
!scope="row"|Five Women for the Killer|
| 
| 
| 
| 
|
|style="text-align:center;"|
|-
!scope="row"|Speed Cross|
| 
| 
| 
| 
|
|style="text-align:center;"|
|-
!scope="row"|Speed Driver|
| 
| 
| 
| 
|
|style="text-align:center;"|
|-
!scope="row"|Guapparia|
| 
| 
| 
| 
|
|style="text-align:center;"|
|-
!scope="row"|Torna|
| 
| 
| 
| 
|
|style="text-align:center;"|
|-
!scope="row"|Mondo cane oggi - L'orrore continua|
| 
| 
| 
| 
| Screen story writer
|style="text-align:center;"|
|-
!scope="row"|The Black Cobra|
| 
| 
| 
| 
| 
|style="text-align:center;"|
|-
!scope="row"|Hell's Heroes - Eroi dell'inferno|
| 
| 
| 
| 
| 
|style="text-align:center;"|
|-
!scope="row"|Arabella: l'angelo nero|
| 
| 
| 
| 
| 
|style="text-align:center;"|
|-
!scope="row"|Droga sterco di Dio|
| 
| 
| 
| 
| 
|style="text-align:center;"|
|-
!scope="row"|The Cry of Truth|
| 
| 
| 
| 
| 
|style="text-align:center;"|
|-
!scope="row"|Alto rischio|
| 
| 
| 
| 
| 
|style="text-align:center;"|
|-
!scope="row"|La pista bulgara|
| 
| 
| 
| 
| 
|style="text-align:center;"|
|-
!scope="row"|Il quinto giorno (5°)|
| 
| 
| 
| 
| 
|style="text-align:center;"|
|-
!scope="row"|Tuono di proiettile|
| 
| 
| 
| 
| 
|style="text-align:center;"|
|-
|}

Notes

References

 
 
 
 

Further reading
  Fulvio Fulvi, Poliziotti senza paura: Stelvio Massi e il cinema d'azione'', Il foglio, 2010,

External links

1929 births
2004 deaths
People from Civitanova Marche
Italian film directors
Poliziotteschi directors